Renato Moulin Piovezan (born 24 April 1986) is a Brazilian footballer who plays as a goalkeeper.

Career
Born in Cachoeiro de Itapemirim, Brazil, Piovezan had spent his youth career for Chievo's Allievi Nazionali U17 and Primavera under-20 team. He then spent on loan at Serie D team Castellana and Serie C2 team Prato (along with Chievo teammate Emiliano Landolina), ahead Stefano Layeni and Americo Gambardella as starting keeper. That season he also selected by Lega Pro under-20 representative team in international youth tournament,  as understudy of Gaetano Romano. In mid-2007 Prato bought Piovezan and Landolina in co-ownership deal and also borrowed Nicolò Brighenti and Diego Reis from Chievo. He made 22 league appearances in 2007–08 Serie C2. In June Prato bought the remain 50% registration rights of Landolina and sold Piovezan back to Chievo. However Piovezan joined another Seconda Divisione team Mezzocorona in another co-ownership deal, as understudy of Massimo Macchi. In June 2009 Chievo bought back Piovezan for a second time but he was transferred to Greek side Aris Thessaloniki on 31 August, after played for Aris in friendly as a trail player. Ca. 2010 he was released by Chievo.

Honours
 Trofeo Città di Arco: 2003 (Chievo U-17)

References

External links
 
 Mezzocorona Profile 
 Calciatori.com Profile 

1986 births
Living people
Sportspeople from Espírito Santo
Brazilian footballers
Italian footballers
Brazilian people of Italian descent
Serie C players
A.C. ChievoVerona players
A.C. Prato players
A.C. Mezzocorona players
Aris Thessaloniki F.C. players
Association football goalkeepers
Brazilian expatriate footballers
Expatriate footballers in Greece